Dryadella is a genus of miniature orchids, formerly included in the genus Masdevallia. Plants are typically composed of a tuft of leaves from 3 to 6 cm long. The small (1–2 cm) flowers are often conspicuously spotted, and are borne at the base of the leaves. There are about 60 species, distributed from southern Mexico to southern Brazil and northern Argentina. In cultivation many of the species seem to respond well to being grown on cork or treefern rather than in pots. The attractive species Dryadella edwallii, commonly known as 'Partridge in the Grass' can be easily grown into a spectacular specimen plant, full of flowers. The genus name of Dryadella refers to Dryad, a tree nymph or tree spirit in Greek mythology.

Range of distribution
They are found in Belize, Bolivia, Brazil, Colombia, Costa Rica, Ecuador, El Salvador, Guatemala, Honduras, Mexico , Nicaragua, Panamá, Paraguay, Peru and Venezuela.

List of species
As accepted by Plants of the World Online (Feb. 2022);

 Dryadella albicans  (Luer) Luer (1978)
 Dryadella ana-paulae  V.P.Castro (2004)
 Dryadella ataleiensis Campacci
 Dryadella aurea  Luer & Hirtz (1999)
 Dryadella auriculigera  (Rchb.f.) Luer (1978)
 Dryadella aviceps  (Rchb.f.) Luer (1978)
 Dryadella barrowii  Luer (2005)
 Dryadella butcheri  Luer (1999)
 Dryadella cardosoi  Campacci & J.B.F.Silva
 Dryadella clavellata  Luer & Hirtz (2005)
 Dryadella crassicaudata  Luer (2005)
 Dryadella crenulata  (Pabst) Luer (1978)
 Dryadella cristata  Luer & R.Escobar (1982)
 Dryadella cuspidata  Luer & Hirtz (1999)
 Dryadella dodsonii  Luer (1999)
 Dryadella dressleri  Luer (1999)
 Dryadella edwallii  (Cogn.) Luer (1978)
 Dryadella elata  (Luer) Luer (1978)
 Dryadella espirito-santensis  (Pabst) Luer (1978)
 Dryadella fuchsii  Luer (1999)
 Dryadella gnoma  (Luer) Luer (1978)
 Dryadella gomes-ferreirae  (Pabst) Luer (1978)
 Dryadella greenwoodiana  Soto Arenas (2002)
 Dryadella guatemalensis  (Schltr.) Luer (1978)
 Dryadella hirtzii  Luer (1980)
 Dryadella kautskyi  (Pabst) Luer (1978)
 Dryadella lilliputiana  (Cogn.) Luer (1978)
 Dryadella linearifolia  (Ames) Luer (1978)
 Dryadella litoralis  Campacci (2007)
 Dryadella lueriana  Carnevali & G.A.Romero (1991)
 Dryadella marilyniana  Luer (2006)
 Dryadella marsupiata  Luer (1982)
 Dryadella meiracyllium  (Rchb.f.) Luer (1978)
 Dryadella minuscula  Luer & R.Escobar (1978)
 Dryadella mocoana  Luer & R.Escobar (2005)
 Dryadella nasuta  Luer & Hirtz (2005)
 Dryadella nortonii  Luer (2005)
 Dryadella odontostele  Luer (1996)
 Dryadella osmariniana  (Braga) Garay & Dunst. (1979)
 Dryadella pachyrhiza  Luer & Hirtz (1999)
 Dryadella perpusilla  (Kraenzl.) Luer (1978)
 Dryadella pusiola  (Rchb.f.) Luer (1978)
 Dryadella rodrigoi  Luer (1999)
 Dryadella sapucaiensis  Campacci & S.L.X.Tobias
 Dryadella simula  (Rchb.f.) Luer (1978)
 Dryadella sororcula  Luer (1996)
 Dryadella speculifera  Vierling
 Dryadella sublata  Luer & J.Portilla (2005)
 Dryadella summersii  (L.O.Williams) Luer (1978)
 Dryadella susanae  (Pabst) Luer (1978)
 Dryadella toscanoi  Luer (2005)
 Dryadella vasquezii  Luer (2005)
 Dryadella verrucosa  Luer & R.Escobar (1999)
 Dryadella vitorinoi  Luer & Toscano (2002)
 Dryadella werneri  Luer (2001)
 Dryadella wuerstlei  Luer (2005)
 Dryadella xavieriana  Campacci & C.R.M.Silva
 Dryadella yupanki  (Luer & R.Vásquez) Karremans (2016)
 Dryadella zebrina  (Porsch) Luer (1978)

References

External links
 
 

 
Pleurothallidinae genera
Orchids of Mexico
Orchids of Central America
Orchids of North America
Orchids of South America